Raszków  is a village in the administrative district of Gmina Radków, within Kłodzko County, Lower Silesian Voivodeship, in south-western Poland. 

References

Villages in Kłodzko County